Lutful Kabir Siddiqi (1939–2014), was a politician and philanthropist from Bangladesh and member of parliament.

Biography
Siddiqi was born on 15 of April 1939 in South Rahmatnagar under Muradpur Union of Shitakundo Thana of Chittagong division. His father was Abul Monsur Lutfe Ahmed Siddiqui.

He was elected member of parliament four times from his constituency Sitakundo, Chittagong. He was the state minister for power in 1978–1981. From 2001 to 2003, he was the water resources minister. He served as the deputy Speaker of Bangladesh Parliament. He was involved with Bangladesh Nationalist Party since inception and till his departure.

Siddiqi died on 1 August 2014.

References

1939 births
2014 deaths
20th-century philanthropists
2nd Jatiya Sangsad members
5th Jatiya Sangsad members
6th Jatiya Sangsad members
8th Jatiya Sangsad members
Bangladesh Nationalist Party politicians
Bangladeshi philanthropists
People from Chittagong
State Ministers of Power, Energy and Mineral Resources
Water Resources ministers